Noble Henry Willingham, Jr. (August 31, 1931 – January 17, 2004) was an American actor who appeared in more than thirty films and in many television shows, including a stint opposite Chuck Norris in Walker, Texas Ranger.

Early life
Willingham was the son of railroad worker and farmer Noble Henry Willingham, Sr, and Ruby Ladelle (née Speights).

He was born in the small town of Mineola, in Wood County east of Dallas, Texas.  After graduating in 1953 from North Texas State College in Denton, he earned a master's degree in educational psychology from Baylor University in Waco, Texas.  Willingham served in the United States Army during the Korean War.

Career
Willingham taught government and economics at Sam Houston High School in Houston before he followed his dream of becoming an actor. He auditioned for a part in The Last Picture Show (1971), which was filmed in Texas. He won the role, which led to another appearance, in Paper Moon (1973).

Willingham appeared in more than thirty feature films, including Chinatown (1974), Aloha, Bobby and Rose (1975), Sheila Levine Is Dead and Living in New York  (1975), Greased Lightning (1977), The Boys in Company C (1978), Norma Rae (1979), Brubaker (1980), The Howling (1981), La Bamba (1987), Good Morning, Vietnam (1987), City Slickers (1991), The Last Boy Scout (1991), Of Mice and Men (1992), Fire In The Sky (1993), The Hudsucker Proxy (1994), Ace Ventura: Pet Detective (1994), and City Slickers II: The Legend of Curly's Gold (1994).

On television, Willingham had a recurring role in the ABC series Home Improvement with Tim Allen as John Binford, and appeared as a guest star in the 1975 CBS family drama series Three for the Road. He also guest starred on Dallas, The A-Team, Murder, She Wrote, Star Trek: The Next Generation (1989),  Northern Exposure, The Rockford Files, Tucker's Witch with Tim Matheson and Catherine Hicks, and Quantum Leap. His additional television credits include A Woman With A Past, The Children Nobody Wanted, The Alamo: Thirteen Days to Glory, and Unconquered. He also played the conductor in Kenny Rogers as The Gambler (1980), Dr. Graham in Living Proof: The Hank Williams Jr. Story (1983),  he appeared in the 1986 miniseries Dream West, and appeared in Badge of the Assassin (1985) and Men Don't Tell (1993). He guest starred as IRS Agent Bumpers in the show Remington Steele.

He was best known for his role as C.D. Parker on the series Walker, Texas Ranger from 1993 to 1999. He left the show to run for the United States House of Representatives.

Filmography

Film

Television

Death
On January 17, 2004, Willingham died in his sleep of a heart attack in Palm Springs at the age of 72.  A veteran of the United States Army during the Korean War, he is buried at Riverside National Cemetery in Riverside, California.

References

External links

 
 

1931 births
2004 deaths
20th-century American male actors
American actor-politicians
American male film actors
American male television actors
Baylor University alumni
Burials at Riverside National Cemetery
California Republicans
Male actors from Palm Springs, California
People from Mineola, Texas
Texas Republicans
University of North Texas alumni